Pawton Quoit is a prehistoric portal dolmen, which dates to the Early and Middle Neolithic period in England (3500–2600 BC). The burial monument is located near Haycrock Farm, south of St Breock, in Cornwall, England.

Description
It sits on a north-facing ridge, looking out over the  a tributary to the River Camel. The barrow was probably originally round, with a lengthening of one axis due to the downhill slope to the north. It has a damaged burial chamber at the south end of the mound. An enormous capstone lies across the chamber, sitting on top on three support stones. Part of the capstone has broken off.

History
A portal dolmen is a closed, single-chamber burial tomb which dates to the Early and Middle Neolithic period in England (3500–2600 BC). It is constructed with two or more vertical megaliths, which are covered by an enormous, flat horizontal capstone. Several portal domens are surrounded by low cairns or platforms. Excavated sites have uncovered cremated human remains, charcoal and pottery fragments. Twenty portal domens have been identified in Britain, the majority of them located in Cornwall and several have been identified in Oxfordshire. Pawton Quoit was first mentioned in historical records  when it was recorded as the "Druid's Altar" on the Ordnance Survey map in 1813.

References

Dolmens in Cornwall
Archaeological sites in Cornwall